is a public university in Kōchi, Kōchi Prefecture, Japan. The predecessor of the school was founded in 1944, and it was chartered as a university in 1949.

Organization
The University of Kochi comprises four undergraduate faculties and two graduate schools.

Faculties
Faculty of Cultural Studies
Faculty of Nursing
Faculty of Social Welfare
Faculty of Nutrition

Graduate schools
Graduate School of Nursing
Graduate School of Human Life Sciences

College of Child Development
It was affiliated with Kochi Women's University, but was located on a separate campus. It became coeducational in 1992. It closed in 1998.

References

External links

 Official website 
 Official website 

Educational institutions established in 1944
Public universities in Japan
Universities and colleges in Kōchi Prefecture
1944 establishments in Japan
Kōchi